Marc Abrahams is the editor and co-founder of Annals of Improbable Research, and the originator and master of ceremonies of the annual Ig Nobel Prize celebration. He was formerly editor of the Journal of Irreproducible Results.

Abrahams is married to Robin Abrahams, also known as "Miss Conduct", a columnist for the Boston Globe.

He graduated from Harvard College with a degree in applied mathematics.

Bibliography 
Books written or edited by Abrahams include:
 This Is Improbable
 The Ig Nobel Prizes
 Why Chickens Prefer Beautiful Humans
 Sex As a Heap of Malfunctioning Rubble
 The Best of "Annals of Improbable Research"
 The Man Who Tried to Clone Himself

References

External links 
 Annals of Improbable Research
 Ig Nobel Prize website
 "Laugh first, think later" (Abrahams' own account of JIR and AIR), The Guardian, June 1, 2004
 
 "A science award that makes you laugh, then think" (TEDMED 2014)

Living people
American information and reference writers
Year of birth missing (living people)
Harvard College alumni